Frank Clifford (1898–1976) was a German film producer. He was involved in early attempts to pioneer sound film production in Europe, directing the short film Paganini in Venice for Tobis Film. During the early 1930s he worked at the Epinay Studios in Paris, overseeing several films produced by the French subsidiary of Tobis. After the Second World War he worked briefly as a screenwriter for DEFA in East Berlin.

Selected filmography
 Paganini in Venice (1929)
 Under the Roofs of Paris (1930)
 The Shark (1930)
 Le Million (1931)
 À Nous la Liberté (1931)
 The Nude Woman (1932)
 Here's Berlin (1932)
 The Marathon Runner (1933)
 Girls of Today (1933)
 What Am I Without You (1934)
 Pappi (1934)
 Artist Love (1935)
 My Life for Maria Isabella (1935)
 Martha (1936)
 White Slaves (1937)
 Chemistry and Love (1948)
 Das Mädchen Christine (1949)
 Don't Dream, Annette (1949)
 Anonymous Letters (1949)
 Nights on the Nile (1949)
 When Men Cheat (1950)
 Wedding in the Hay (1951)
 We're Dancing on the Rainbow (1952)
 Victoria and Her Hussar (1954)
 Marianne of My Youth (1955)
 The Star of Rio (1955)

References

Bibliography

External links 
 

1898 births
1976 deaths
People from East Prussia
German film producers
German male screenwriters
People from Szczytno
20th-century German screenwriters